Tivoli Gardens, Copenhagen, Denmark is an album by jazz violinist  Stéphane Grappelli, recorded live in 1979 and released in 1980.

Reception 

Writing for AllMusic, music critic Scott Yanow wrote of the album "By the time the 71-year-old Stephane Grappelli made this live trio recording with guitarist Joe Pass and bassist Niels-Henning Orsted Pedersen, his legacy as the greatest of all jazz violinists was firmly in place.[...] The program itself is practically a Grapelli greatest-hits collection -- "It's Only a Paper Moon," "Crazy Rhythm," "How Deep Is the Ocean," etc. -- which makes this disc a perfect introduction to his art for anyone looking for a good place to begin. Highly recommended."

An article on allaboutjazz.com states "A live concert of a small group that swings very big has been preserved for our enjoyment. These musicians play strongly and immaculately cohesive. If you like music that really swings with melody that sings and floats, you'll love this album. "

The Penguin Guide to Jazz selected this album as part of its suggested Core Collection.

Track-Listing

Personnel 
Stéphane Grappelli – violin
 Joe Pass – guitar
 Niels-Henning Ørsted Pedersen – double bass

References 

1980 live albums
Stéphane Grappelli albums
Pablo Records live albums
Live albums by French artists